The 1975 San Diego Padres season was the seventh in franchise history. The Padres finished in fourth place in the National League West, the first time that they did not finish last in the division.

Offseason 
 October 3, 1974: Horace Clarke was released by the Padres.
 November 8, 1974: Cito Gaston was traded by the Padres to the Atlanta Braves for Danny Frisella.
 November 18, 1974: Nate Colbert was traded by the Padres to the Detroit Tigers as part of a 3-team trade. The Padres sent a player to be named later to the St. Louis Cardinals. The Tigers sent Bob Strampe and Dick Sharon to the Padres, and the Cardinals sent Alan Foster, Rich Folkers, and Sonny Siebert to the Padres. The Tigers sent Ed Brinkman to the Cardinals. The Padres completed the deal by sending Danny Breeden to the Cardinals on December 12, 1974.
 December 6, 1974: Derrel Thomas was traded by the Padres to the San Francisco Giants for Tito Fuentes and Butch Metzger.

Draft picks 
 January 9, 1975: 1975 Major League Baseball draft
Gene Richards was drafted by the Padres in the 1st round (1st pick).
Rick Sweet was drafted in the 3rd round of the Secondary Phase.

Regular season

Season standings

Record vs. opponents

Opening Day starters 
Glenn Beckert
Tito Fuentes
Johnny Grubb
Enzo Hernández
Randy Hundley
Randy Jones
Willie McCovey
Bobby Tolan
Dave Winfield

Notable transactions 
 April 7, 1975: Bill Laxton was released by the Padres.
 April 28, 1975: Glenn Beckert was released by the Padres.
 May 23, 1975: Chuck Hartenstein was signed as a free agent by the Padres.
 September 17, 1975: Gary Ross was traded by the Padres to the California Angels for Bobby Valentine and a player to be named later. The Angels completed the deal by sending Rudy Meoli to the Padres on November 4.

Roster

Player stats

Batting

Starters by position 
Note: Pos = Position; G = Games played; AB = At bats; H = Hits; Avg. = Batting average; HR = Home runs; RBI = Runs batted in

Other batters 
Note: G = Games played; AB = At bats; H = Hits; Avg. = Batting average; HR = Home runs; RBI = Runs batted in

Pitching

Starting pitchers 
Note: G = Games pitched; IP = Innings pitched; W = Wins; L = Losses; ERA = Earned run average; SO = Strikeouts

Other pitchers 
Note: G = Games pitched; IP = Innings pitched; W = Wins; L = Losses; ERA = Earned run average; SO = Strikeouts

Relief pitchers 
Note: G = Games pitched; W = Wins; L = Losses; SV = Saves; ERA = Earned run average; SO = Strikeouts

Awards and honors 
 Randy Jones, The Sporting News NL Comeback Player of the Year honors
 Randy Jones, ERA Champion (2.24)

All-Stars 
1975 Major League Baseball All-Star Game
 Randy Jones

Farm system 

LEAGUE CHAMPIONS: Hawaii, Reno

Reno affiliation shared with Minnesota Twins

Notes

References 
 1975 San Diego Padres at Baseball Reference
 1975 San Diego Padres at Baseball Almanac
 

San Diego Padres seasons
San Diego Padres season
San Diego Padres